Rokas Pukštas (born August 25, 2004) is an American professional soccer player who plays as a midfielder for Croatian First Football League club Hajduk Split.

Club career
Pukštas joined Sporting Kansas City's youth academy in 2018, and had a trial with Manchester United in 2019. He moved to the Barça Residency Academy in January 2020, where he was a regular starter of their youth sides. He signed a professional contract with Hajduk Split on November 10, 2020, joining their U17 side. He made his professional debut with Hajduk Split in a 2–1 Croatian First Football League win over Hrvatski Dragovoljac on April 29, 2022.

International career
Pukštas is eligible to play for the United States and Lithuania. He represented the United States U15s in 2019, and the United States U20s in 2021. He was approached to represent the senior Lithuania national team in March 2022.

Personal life
Pukštas was born in Stillwater, Oklahoma to a family of Lithuanian athletes. His father, Mindaugas Pukštas, was a Lithuanian marathon runner who came 74th in his discipline at the 2004 Summer Olympics.

Honors
United States U20
CONCACAF U-20 Championship: 2022

References

External links
 

2004 births
Living people
People from Stillwater, Oklahoma
Soccer players from Oklahoma
American soccer players
United States men's youth international soccer players
American people of Lithuanian descent
Association football midfielders
HNK Hajduk Split players
NK Solin players
Croatian Football League players
First Football League (Croatia) players
American expatriate soccer players
Expatriate footballers in Croatia
American expatriates in Croatia
United States men's under-20 international soccer players